Epirrhoe tristata, the small argent and sable, is a moth of the genus Epirrhoe in the family Geometridae. The species was first described by Carl Linnaeus in his 1758 10th edition of Systema Naturae.

Distribution
The species can be found in the Palearctic realm, in western Europe from Scandinavia in the north to just south of the Alps, then east to the Caucasus, Russia, Russian Far East, and Siberia.

Description
The wingspan is 24–26 mm. The forewing ground colour is white. There is a light brown central band with white edge lines. The outer margins of all wings are black with a small faint line.

Biology
The moth flies from May to July. The larva feeds on Galium species. It hibernates as pupa in a cocoon on the ground.

Upland habitats include moorland, limestone grassland, woodland and hedgerows. Lowland habitats include steppe, heaths and mosses.

References

External links

Small argent and sable at UKMoths
Lepidoptera of Belgium
Lepiforum e.V.
De Vlinderstichting 

Epirrhoe
Moths of Europe
Moths of Asia
Taxa named by Carl Linnaeus